Daniel Lohm (born 26 January 1978) is a retired Swedish football midfielder.

References

1978 births
Living people
Swedish footballers
Örgryte IS players
Association football midfielders
Allsvenskan players
Place of birth missing (living people)